Autosticha pentagona is a moth in the family Autostichidae. It was described by Kyu-Tek Park and Chun-Sheng Wu in 2003. It is found in Guangdong, China.

References

Moths described in 2003
Autosticha
Moths of Asia